Stalinist repressions is a period in Soviet history during the Stalin era. Examples include:
 Anti-cosmopolitan campaign (late 1948)
 Dekulakization (1929–1933)
 Doctor's Plot (1951–1953)
 Great Purge (1936–1938), the most usual meaning
 Population transfer in the Soviet Union (1930–1952)
 Night of the Murdered Poets (12 August 1952)

See also 
 Stalinist repressions in Mongolia

Human rights abuses in the Soviet Union
Stalinism